Thomas Pletzinger (born 1975 in Münster) is a German writer and translator. He is best known for his debut novel Bestattung eines Hundes, which was published in 2008 to wide acclaim. It has been translated into English as Funeral for a Dog. Pletzinger served as the writer-in-residence in the German department at Grinnell College in 2010 and again in 2014.

Works

English translations

References

21st-century German novelists
1975 births
Living people
German translators
German male novelists
International Writing Program alumni
21st-century German male writers
German male non-fiction writers
21st-century translators